Genay is a commune in the Metropolis of Lyon in Auvergne-Rhône-Alpes region in eastern France.

Geography
Genay is located about 20 kilometres north of Lyon.

Surrounding communes
In the Metropolis of Lyon:
Montanay
Neuville-sur-Saône
Saint-Germain-au-Mont-d'Or
In the department of Ain:
Civrieux
Massieux

Demographics

History
Genay was the capital of former Franc-Lyonnais. Genay left the department of Ain to join the department of Rhône in 1968, and became of a member of the Urban Community of Lyon in 1969. On 1 January 2015 Genay left the department of Rhône to join the Metropolis of Lyon.

References

External links

  Genay website

Communes of Lyon Metropolis